A comedian is an entertainer who performs in a comic manner, especially by telling jokes.

Comedian or comedians may also refer to:

Films
 Comedienne (film), a 1923 film
 The Comedians (1941 film), a 1941 film
 Comedians (1925 film), a German silent film
 Comedians (1954 film), a Spanish drama film
 The Comedians (1967 film), a 1967 film based on the novel by Graham Greene
 Comedian (film), a 2002 documentary focused on Jerry Seinfeld
 The Comedian (2012 film), a 2012 film
 The Comedian (2016 film), a 2016 film starring Robert De Niro
 Comedian (character), a fictional character in the 2009 film Watchmen and the graphic novel series upon which it is based

Television
 The Comedian (Playhouse 90), a 1957 live drama written by Rod Serling and directed by John Frankenheimer
 The Comedians (1971 TV series), a British television show of the 1970s and mid-1980s
The Comedians (2015 TV series), a 2015 FX comedy starring Billy Crystal and Josh Gad
 Comedians (Beavis and Butt-Head), an episode of the TV series Beavis and Butt-Head
 "The Comedian" (episode), 2019 episode of the television series The Twilight Zone

Music
 The Comedians (Kabalevsky), a 1940 concert suite by Dmitry Kabalevsky
 The Comedians (Glière), Op. 68, a ballet written by Reinhold Glière in 1922 and revised in 1930 and 1935, also arranged into two orchestral suites
 Eddie Murphy: Comedian, a 1983 album by American entertainer Eddie Murphy
 "Comedian", a song by Devon Welsh from the 2018 album Dream Songs
 "Comedian", a song by Telenova from the 2021 EP Tranquilize
 "The Comedians", a song by Elvis Costello from the album Goodbye Cruel World

Others
 The Comedians (novel), a 1966 novel by Graham Greene
 Comedians (play), a 1975 play by Trevor Griffiths
 Comedian (comics), a character from the 1986 comic book series Watchmen
 Comedian (artwork), a banana taped to a wall with duct tape by Maurizio Cattelan
 List of comedians

See also
 Joker (disambiguation)
 Jester (disambiguation)
 Jokester (disambiguation)
 Practical joker (disambiguation)
 Funny Man (disambiguation)
 Comic (disambiguation)